"Persuasive" is a song by American rapper Doechii. It was released through Top Dawg on March 18, 2022. A remix featuring SZA was later released on July 22, 2022, as the second single to her sophomore EP She / Her / Black Bitch.

Background 
In March 2022, it was reported that Doechii had been signed to Top Dawg Entertainment and Capitol Records, making her the first female rapper to be signed with the former label. This would lead to "Persuasive" being released later that month as her first major label single.

Composition 
"Persuasive" was written by Doechii, Austin Daniel Brown, Kal Banx, Oh Gosh Leotus, Ivan Jackson, and Zach Witness. The song is an uptempo dance track blending both house and hip hop music. Doechii said that her main reason behind the song's creation was to "uplift people and bring communities together."

Music video 
The music video for "Persuasive" was directed by Omar Jones and released on March 30, 2022.

Critical reception 

"Persuasive" received mostly positive reviews from music critics. Billboard placed the song at number 88 on their Best Songs of 2022 list, calling it a "buttery" track and a "stellar kickback". Grace Medford of DIY called the track a "sultry purr of appreciation for spending the whole day faded". The Fader placed the song at number 17 of their 100 Best Songs of 2022. Gyasi Williams-Kirtley of The Fader gave props to the song for allowing Doechii to show a more "mellow persona" and calling it "flirtatious, sharp, and provocative".

Year-end list

Accolades

Remix

Background and release
Doechii announced a remix for "Persuasive" with SZA in July 2022, with a video of her reaction to SZA's feature on the song. Both artists are under the same label, Top Dawg Entertainment. 

It debuted on the Billboard Mainstream R&B/Hip-Hop Airplay chart at number 37 on September 17, 2022. The song ultimately peaked at number 33 after three weeks on the chart.

Music video 
The music video for the "Persuasive" Remix was released on September 1, 2022.

Charts

References

2022 songs
2022 singles